Akes or AKES may refer to:
 Akes (river)
 Akes, Georgia, United States
 Aga Khan Education Services